The Old Campus Historic District is a national historic district on the campus of St. Lawrence University in Canton, New York, United States.  The district includes eight contributing buildings and two contributing objects.  It encompasses the structures built before 1930 and includes Beta Theta Pi Temple (1925–26), Gunnison Memorial Chapel (1925–26), Carnegie Hall (1905–06), Hepburn Hall (1925), Sykes Residence for Men (1930), Memorial Hall (1909), Piskor Hall (1907–09), Payson Hall (1910–11), and Dean-Eaton Residence Hall (1926–27).  Also in the district are the separately listed Richardson Hall (1855–56) and Herring-Cole Hall (1869–1902).

It was listed on the National Register of Historic Places in 1983 as St. Lawrence University – Old Campus Historic District.

References

Historic districts on the National Register of Historic Places in New York (state)
Historic districts in St. Lawrence County, New York
National Register of Historic Places in St. Lawrence County, New York
1856 establishments in New York (state)